Francis I de Bourbon, Count of St. Pol, Duke of Estouteville (6 October 1491 – 1 September 1545), was a French prince and important military commander during the Italian Wars.

Francis was the second son of Francis, Count of Vendôme and Marie de Luxembourg, Countess of Saint-Pol. As such he was a prince du sang in France. His appanage, the countship of St. Pol, came from his mother's Luxembourg inheritance.

His marriage on 9 February 1534 with the heiress Adrienne, Dame d’Estouteville, brought him several baronies which comprised the lands of the Norman House of Estouteville: Vallemont, Varengeville, Berneval, and Cleuville. These were erected for Francis into the dukedom of Estouteville by royal letters patent registered 12 September 1534 in the Parlement of Rouen, the couple's marriage contract being registered by the Parlement of Paris on 16 April 1540. In 1537 he exchanged the countship of St. Pol for that of Montfort-l'Amaury with King Francis I, but in 1544 it was returned to him to enjoy as before the war.

He was knighted by Pierre Terrail, seigneur de Bayard after the Battle of Marignano in 1515. He participated in the defence of Mézières in 1521, fought under Bonnivet and Bayard at the lost Battle of the Sesia (1524) and was made prisoner at the Battle of Pavia in 1525.

In 1527 he became governor of the Dauphiné, and was as such responsible for the French operations against Savoy and Piedmont. His army was destroyed and he was taken prisoner in the Battle of Landriano, until the Treaty of Cambrai in 1529.

He was present at the meeting between Francis I of France and Pope Clement VII in Marseille in 1533.

In 1542, he joined the Dauphin in Picardy and Luxembourg. In 1543, he was part of the French command against the English and Spanish in Picardy. In the Italian War of 1542–1546, he was charged with the conquest of Savoy. He advised against the Battle of Ceresole (1544), but was overruled by Blaise de Lasseran-Massencôme, seigneur de Montluc, who won the battle.

Marriage and children 
He married, on 9 February 1534, Adrienne, duchesse d'Estouteville 1512-1560: 
 Francis II de Bourbon-Saint-Pol (1536-1546),
 Marie (1539-1601), his successor, married his first cousin Jean, Count of Soissons and Enghien, and then Léonor d'Orléans, duc de Longueville.

References

Charles Gavard, «Galerie Historique du Palais de Versailles. Vol.VIII» (1846) Imprimerie Royale.

1491 births
1545 deaths
Military leaders of the Italian Wars
Counts of Saint-Pol
People from Somme (department)